Iztacalco is a station along Line 8 of the Mexico City Metro.

Iztacalco is in the borough of the same name, in Mexico City. Its logo represents the monastery of San Matías, the first church on Calzada de la Viga.  The Nahuatl toponym Iztacalco means "in the house of salt". The station was opened on 20 July 1994.

Like the other stations on this stretch of Line 8, Iztacalco stands on Avenida Francisco del Paso y Troncoso (eje 3 Ote). It also connected with trolleybus line "M", which runs between INFONAVIT Iztacalco residential estate and Metro Villa de Cortés.  This station is the closest to the Colegio de Bachilleres Plantel 3 "Iztacalco".

Ridership

References

External links 
 

Iztacalco
Railway stations opened in 1994
1994 establishments in Mexico
Mexico City Metro stations in Iztacalco
Accessible Mexico City Metro stations